This was a tennis rivalry  played between French player Jean Borotra and the French player Henri Cochet, which in their respective careers the met 16 times from 1922 until 1949.

Jean Borotra a former World Number 2 and four time Grand Slam singles champion and Henri Cochet a former World number 1 and seven time Grand Slam champion, three time ITF Major champion and one time Pro Slam champion and both Davis Cup champions.

Summary
They first met in each other in the final of the World Covered Court Championships at Palace Lawn Tennis Club, in St. Moritz in 1922 with Cochet winning there inugrial meeting. Their final meeting was at the Pierre Gillou Cup In Paris in the semi finals in 1949 that time Borotra was the winner. They played each other on multiple surfaces including grass courts, clay courts, hard courts and wood courts and in different environments both outdoors and indoors.

Head-to-head

Official matches (Borotra 8–8 Cochet)

Breakdown of their rivalry
All matches: Tied, 8–8
All finals: Cochet, 5–3
Grand Slam matches: Tied, 3–3
Grand Slam finals: Tied, 3–3
Clay courts: Cochet, 4–2
Grass courts: Tied, 2–2
Hard courts: Borotra, 4–2
Outdoor courts: Cochet, 7-6
Indoor courts: Borotra, 2–1

See also
List of tennis rivalries

References

Sources
 "Jean Borotra -Henri Cochet-Matches Head 2 Head". thetennisbase.com.

Tennis rivalries